

378001–378100 

|-id=002
| 378002 ʻAkialoa ||  || The ʻakialoa are a group of birds that were native to the Hawaiian Islands. They had a long, curved bill that took up one-third of their body length, and had yellow plumage. The ʻakialoa are now extinct on O`ahu and Maui, and likely on Kaua`i. || 
|-id=076
| 378076 Campani ||  || Giuseppe Campani (c.1636–1715) was an Italian astronomer and telescope maker. || 
|}

378101–378200 

|-bgcolor=#f2f2f2
| colspan=4 align=center | 
|}

378201–378300 

|-id=204
| 378204 Bettyhesser ||  || Betty Hinsdale Hesser (born 1938), passionately curious about, and gifted in languages, music and science, generously shares in an easily accessible manner her extensive knowledge, particularly about astronomy and reptiles, with people of all ages to address common misunderstandings and stimulate broader comprehension of nature. || 
|-id=214
| 378214 Sauron ||  || Sauron is a fictional character in J. R. R. Tolkien's fantasy novel The Lord of the Rings. He created the One Ring to rule the rings of power. Due to Sauron's war-like nature, a Mars-crossing minor planet was chosen to receive his name. || 
|}

378301–378400 

|-id=370
| 378370 Orton ||  || Glenn S. Orton (born 1948) is a senior research scientist at NASA's Jet Propulsion Laboratory, and principal investigator of atmospheric structures of both Jupiter and Saturn. He is a member of the American Astronomical Society and the IAU, as well as the American and European Geophysical Unions. || 
|}

378401–378500 

|-bgcolor=#f2f2f2
| colspan=4 align=center | 
|}

378501–378600 

|-bgcolor=#f2f2f2
| colspan=4 align=center | 
|}

378601–378700 

|-id=669
| 378669 Rivas ||  || Marc Rivas (born 1942), a French amateur astronomer. || 
|}

378701–378800 

|-id=721
| 378721 Thizy ||  || Olivier Thizy (born 1966), a French engineer. || 
|}

378801–378900 

|-bgcolor=#f2f2f2
| colspan=4 align=center | 
|}

378901–379000 

|-id=917
| 378917 Stefankarge ||  || Stefan Karge (born 1963), a German amateur astronomer and discoverer of minor planets || 
|-id=920
| 378920 Vassimre ||  || Imre Vass (1795–1863) was a Hungarian geodesist, cartographer and speleologist, known for exploring the Baradla cave. || 
|}

References 

378001-379000